Howardites are achondritic stony meteorites that originate from the surface of the asteroid 4 Vesta, and as such are part of the HED meteorite clan. There are about 200 distinct members known.

Characteristics
They are a regolith breccia consisting mostly of eucrite and diogenite fragments, although carbonaceous chondrules and impact melt can also occur. The rock formed from impact ejecta which was later buried by newer impacts and lithified due to the pressure from overlying layers. Regolith breccias are not found on Earth due to a lack of regolith on bodies which have an atmosphere.

Name
Howardites are named for Edward Howard, a pioneer of meteoritics.
An arbitrary divide between howardites and the polymict eucrites is a 9:1 ratio of eucrite to diogenite fragments.

See also
 Glossary of meteoritics

References

External links 
Howardite images - Meteorites Australia

Planetary science
Asteroidal achondrites
4 Vesta